Skipton Town Hall is the town hall of Skipton, North Yorkshire. It is located on the town's High Street and is home to Craven Museum & Gallery as well as a Concert Hall with events and performance programme and Skipton Tourist Information Centre. Skipton Town Council also reside in the Victorian building, which is Grade II listed.

History

The Town Hall, 19 High Street, was designed in the Classical style and built in 1862 on the site of the former vicarage of the Holy Trinity Parish Church by the Skipton Public Buildings Company. The design included a two-storeyed portico with two Corinthian order columns and two pilasters on the ground floor and four Corinthian order columns on the first floor. The balcony at the front of the building was used to make public announcements.  Later the hall and the building next to it, 17 High Street, a commercial building were integrated together. In 1878, Alterations were made to increase the height of the main hall and was used by a private company as a public functions room.

In 1895, upon the creation of Skipton Urban District Council, the building was purchased to replace the former town hall situated on Sheep Street. During the 19th century a glass canopy was built onto the front of the Town Hall and lasted until the 1950s, and in 1935 the hall was made larger to accommodate more office space. In 1974 when the Craven District Council was formed and moved the museum from its previous location at the library to the first floor of the town hall annexe, and a professional museum team were hired to run the museum. Also located in the town hall is the council chamber where for over 100 years the urban district council and now the craven district council have held meetings. A point of interest in the chamber are the benches and chairs which were made by the legendary furniture maker Robert Thompson also known as the "mouseman".

In spring 2019 work started on a redevelopment project, supported by the Heritage Lottery Fund and costing £4.5 million, to restore and upgrade the concert hall, to redesign the museum and to provide new gallery space.

References

External links
 Craven District Council page

Grade II listed buildings in North Yorkshire
Skipton
City and town halls in North Yorkshire
Government buildings completed in 1862